Federico Valentini (born 22 January 1982) is a retired San Marinese footballer who last played for S.S. Pennarossa and for many other amateur Sammarinese and Italian sides as well as for the San Marino national football team. 

He works as a bank clerk.

References

External links

1982 births
Living people
Sammarinese footballers
Association football goalkeepers
San Marino international footballers
S.S. Murata players
S.P. Tre Fiori players
S.P. Tre Penne players
Sammarinese expatriate footballers
Expatriate footballers in Italy
Sammarinese expatriate sportspeople in Italy
Campionato Sammarinese di Calcio players